"BoJack Horseman: The BoJack Horseman Story, Chapter One" is the first episode of the first season of the American animated television series BoJack Horseman. It was written by Raphael Bob-Waksberg and directed by Joel Moser. The episode was released in the United States, along with the rest of season one, via Netflix on August 22, 2014.

The episode introduces the title character, BoJack Horseman, an anthropomorphic horse, living on residuals after starring in a 1990s sitcom, Horsin' Around. More than 20 years after the show's end, BoJack plans to return to his former celebrity status, and with the assistance of his agent Princess Carolyn, ghostwriter Diane Nguyen, and roommate Todd Chavez, tries to write a memoir.

Plot 
The series' first episode follows BoJack as he tries to revive his dormant acting career. After a breakup with his girlfriend, Princess Carolyn, the night before, BoJack wakes up hungover. Princess Carolyn, who is also his talent agent, encourages him to write a celebrity tell-all. BoJack struggles to begin the book until he meets ghostwriter Diane Nguyen at a party and the two agree to work together to tell his story. He also discovers, to his disappointment, that Diane is dating Mr. Peanutbutter, his former sitcom rival.

Reception 
The episode, which was released all together with season one, received mixed reviews. Erik Adams of The A.V. Club gave the season a C+ rating and wrote that the series "stumbles out of the gate". In a more positive review, Slate's Willa Paskin described the season as "often very clever", and praised its direction. Margaret Lyons, writing for Vulture, described it as "the funniest show about depression ever".

References

External links 
 "BoJack Horseman: The BoJack Horseman Story, Chapter One" on Netflix
 

BoJack Horseman episodes
2014 American television episodes